The Brilliant Green is the self-titled first album by the band of the same name. It was originally released on September 19, 1998 and reissued in 2004.

Track listing

1998 albums
The Brilliant Green albums